Gail Curtice Henley (born October 15, 1928) is a retired American professional baseball player, scout and manager.

Playing career
Born in Wichita, Kansas, Henley grew up in Los Angeles, where he graduated from Inglewood High School and attended the University of Southern California. As a sophomore, he starred for the 1948 national-champion USC Trojans baseball team, batting .400. He then signed a professional contract with the New York Giants.

Henley would never play for the Giants, however; after five years in their farm system, he was acquired by the Pirates via the Cincinnati Redlegs in October 1952 in a transaction that brought four-time National League All-Star Gus Bell to Cincinnati. Henley made the 1954 Pirates out of spring training and appeared in 14 of the Bucs' first 22 games. After going hitless in his first four major league at bats, Henley broke through on April 19 with a first-inning home run against his old team, the Giants, a key blow in a 7–5 Pirate victory. But Henley was hurt when he ran into a wall during a game against Brooklyn, then ran afoul of general manager Branch Rickey when he went dancing at a nightclub as he was recovering from the head injury. When the rosters were cut from 28 to 25 men in May, he was sent to Double-A New Orleans and never returned to the majors. His nine MLB hits also included a double, and he drove in two runs, both RBI coming from his April 19 homer.

Minor league manager and scout
Henley remained in baseball for another 50 years as a player, manager and scout. He ran teams in the Detroit Tigers' minor league system from 1961–66. Then he joined the Los Angeles Dodgers as a scout based in Southern California, in addition to handling Rookie-level Dodger farm clubs for six seasons during the 1970s and 1980s. He later scouted for the Kansas City Royals, San Diego Padres and Tampa Bay Devil Rays.

Teams managed
Montgomery Rebels (1961)
Thomasville Tigers (1962)
Lakeland Tigers (1963)
Duluth–Superior Dukes (1964)
Jamestown Tigers (1965)
Daytona Beach Islanders (1966)
Ogden Dodgers (1972–1973)
Lethbridge Dodgers (1977, 1979–1980, 1983)

References

Further reading

Articles
 Associated Press. "USC Outfielder Signs With New York Giants". The Spokane Spokesman-Review. June 28, 1948.
 Associated Press. "Squad Games On Majors' Slates". The Kentucky New Era. March 7, 1949.
 Fullerton, Jr., Hugh. "Roundup: Stars From College Baseball Catch Eyes Of Seasoned Pros, Catch On". The Milwaukee Journal. March 17, 1949.
 Associated Press. "Home Steal Wins". The Milwaukee Sentinel. April 3, 1949.
 Associated Press. "Training Camp Briefs: Rookie Slugger". The Rome News-Tribune. March 13, 1952.
 Associated Press. "Stretch Hurler Down On Option". The Spokane Spokesman-Review. April 16, 1952.
 "Gus Bell Traded to Reds for Three Players: Bucs Get Abrams, Rossi and Henley". The Pittsburgh Post-Gazette. October 15, 1952.
 Hernon, Jack. "Haney Says Bucs Better Than Anticipated; Pirate Boss Raps Critics of His Club". The Pittsburgh Post-Gazette. April 4, 1953.
 Hernon, Jack. "Henley's First Hit a Homer, Bucs Win, 7-5; Giants Victimized By 5-Run Third; Rookie Socks Two-Run Clout In First Inning Of His Debut". The Pittsburgh Post-Gazette. April 20, 1954.
 "Teammate Goes to Aid of Fallen Pirate; Wall Wins; Scared Me, Pal". The Pittsburgh Post-Gazette.  April 26, 1954.
 McHugh, Roy. "Sports Week in Review". The Pittsburgh Press. May 1, 1954.
 Biederman, Les. "The Scoreboard: Henley Becomes Part of 'New Orleans Story'". The Pittsburgh Press. May 13, 1954.
 Hernon, Jack. "Roamin' Around: Toughest Time of the Year". The Pittsburgh Post-Gazette. May 13, 1954.
 Biederman, Les. "The Scoreboard". The Pittsburgh Press. May 14, 1954. 
 United Press. "Stars Sell Henley". The Pittsburgh Press. May 20, 1955.
 Butler, Vernon (AP). "Southern Association: Henley Sparks in Barons' Win". The Florence Times Daily. April 26, 1960.
 "Lakeland Tigers Name Henley Pilot". The Lakeland Ledger. November 30, 1962.
 Slayton, Jack. "Slants on Sports". The Lakeland Ledger. March 14, 1963.
 Slayton, Jack. "Lakeland Tigers Appear Set for Season Opener". The Lakeland Ledger. April 14, 1963.
 Slayton, Jack. "Slants on Sports; Henley Offers Umpire Solution". The Lakeland Ledger. August 1, 1963. 
 "Baseball: Gail Henley To Manage Islanders". The Daytona Beach Morning Journal. December 24, 1965.
 Willson, Brad. "Press Box". The Daytona Beach Morning Journal. February 18, 1966.
 Willson, Brad. "Shake-Up Slated For Islanders: 'Good, Kids, Bad Ballplayers'". The Daytona Beach Morning Journal. July 22, 1966.
 Willson, Brad. "Press Box: Four New, Young Tigers Answer Cry For Help". The Daytona Beach Morning Journal. July 22, 1966.
 Hudson, Maryann. "Baseball Daily Report: Dodgers: Karros Gets Three-Year Deal". The Los Angeles Times. February 25, 1994.

Books
 Genovese, George; Taylor, Dan. (2015). "The Unlikeliest Result". A Scout's Report: My 70 Years in Baseball. Jefferson, NC: McFarland & Company. .
 Gmelch, George (2016). Playing With the Tigers: A Minor League Chronicle of the Sixties. Lincoln, NE: University of Nebraska Press. .

External links

1928 births
Living people
Águilas Cibaeñas players
American expatriate baseball players in the Dominican Republic
American expatriate baseball players in Mexico
American expatriate baseball players in Panama
Baseball players from Wichita, Kansas
Birmingham Barons players
Columbus Jets players
Hollywood Stars players
Inglewood High School (California) alumni
Jersey City Giants players
Kansas City Royals scouts
Lakeland Flying Tigers managers
Los Angeles Dodgers scouts
Major League Baseball left fielders
Major League Baseball right fielders
Minneapolis Millers (baseball) players
Montgomery Rebels players
New Orleans Pelicans (baseball) players
Pittsburgh Pirates players
San Diego Padres scouts
Sioux City Soos players
Baseball players from Los Angeles
Baseball players from Inglewood, California
Tampa Bay Rays scouts
Tigres del México players
Tulsa Oilers (baseball) players
USC Trojans baseball players